Yordan Eduardo Santa Cruz Vera (born 7 October 1993) is a Cuban professional football player who plays for the Cuba national team. 

He debuted internationally in March 2015 against the Dominican Republic with a 3-0 victory. In September 2018, he scored twice against Turks and Caicos Islands in an 11-0 victory, resulting in a huge win for Cuba.

Career 
Santa Cruz played in the Campeonato Nacional de Fútbol de Cuba in 2009 with FC Cienfuegos. In 2018, he played for a season with FC Santiago de Cuba before returning to Cienfuegos the following year. In 2019, he was named the province's best footballer of the year. In 2019, he played abroad in the Liga Dominicana de Fútbol with Jarabacoa FC. 

In 2020, he played in the Canadian Soccer League with Scarborough SC. In his debut season with Scarborough he assisted in securing the First Division title.

International career

International goals
Cuba score listed first, score column indicates score after each Santa Cruz goal.

Rape accusation 
Santa Cruz Vera was accused of rape by an American woman in an incident that occurred in Jamaica on March 31, 2015. Cuba's national soccer team had just participated in an international friendly match against Jamaica's team in the Montego Bay Sports Complex. According to the lawsuit, the woman identified Santa Cruz Vera as one of three men that raped her in a resort bathroom. In the lawsuit, the woman said the Cuban government intervened on the players’ behalf and compromised the investigation. DNA evidence from the athletes was not provided to Jamaican authorities, according to law enforcement there. To this day, no one has been arrested or charged.

References

Living people
1993 births
Cuban footballers
Cuba international footballers
Association football midfielders
FC Cienfuegos players
FC Santiago de Cuba players
Don Bosco Jarabacoa FC players
Liga Dominicana de Fútbol players
Scarborough SC players
Cuban expatriate footballers
Cuban expatriate sportspeople in the Dominican Republic
Expatriate footballers in the Dominican Republic
Canadian Soccer League (1998–present) players